Debarca is a municipality in the Southwestern Statistical Region of North Macedonia. The village of Belčišta is the municipal seat. It is the municipality in which Ohrid "St. Paul the Apostle" Airport is located, the second of two international airports in the county.

Geography
The municipality borders Kičevo Municipality to the northeast, Demir Hisar Municipality to the east, Ohrid Municipality to the south, and Struga Municipality to the west.

The municipality encompasses the Debarca Valley, part of the Sateska River watershed that flows into Lake Ohrid and belongs to the Lake Ohrid Drainage Basin.

The majority of the villages are nestled between the Karaorman Mountain in the west and Ilinska Mountain in the east.

Demographics
The municipality consists of 30 villages.

According to the last national census from 2021 this municipality has 3,719 inhabitants.

References

 
Southwestern Statistical Region
Municipalities of North Macedonia